Coleophora arens is a moth of the family Coleophoridae that is endemic to Namibia.

References

External links

arens
Moths of Africa
Endemic fauna of Namibia
Moths described in 2004